English River was a lake freighter and bulk carrier, launched in 1961 by Collingwood Shipyards of Collingwood, Ontario. In her initial years she carried bulk cargoes and deck cargoes to smaller ports on the Great Lakes and Saint Lawrence River watershed and estuary. In 1973, the vessel was converted into a cement carrier and carried mainly raw cement for the construction industry. The ship continued to operate until English River was removed from service and sold for scrap.

Description
English River was constructed as a St. Lawrence Seaway package freighter operating on the Seaway and the Great Lakes.

Construction and career
The vessel was laid down on 20 March 1961 by Collingwood Shipyards in Collingwood, Ontario with the yard number 171. The ship was launched on 8 September 1961 and completed in October. Initially owned by Canadian General Electric and registered in Collingwood, however they never operated the vessel. English River was bareboat chartered to Canada Steamship Lines (CSL) immediately. CSL bought the vessel in 1963 as a better highway system around the Great Lakes led to a decline in package freight demand.

In 1973, the vessel was converted into a cement carrier and equipped with self-unloading equipment by Port Arthur Shipbuilding in what is now Thunder Bay, Ontario. After the conversion was complete, ownership of English River was acquired by Laurentide Financial Corporation of Vancouver, British Columbia, with CSL remaining as managers. English River returned to service in late 1973, chartered to Canada Cement Lafarge. In 1984, ownership of the cement carrier changed to National Bank Leasing, returning to CSL's ownership in 1989, and the ship was registered in Montreal, Quebec. Canada Cement Lafarge continued chartering the ship until 1993, when English River was purchased by the company, but remained under CSL's management.

In 1996 she collided with a dock in Cleveland, Ohio. In 2012 an employee of Port Weller Dry Docks was seriously injured when he fell  into her hold in a shipyard in Port Weller, Ontario.

In 2017–2018, the vessel was managed by Algoma Central for Lafarge. English River was taken out of service in 2018 to be sold for scrap. The ship was sold to International Marine Salvage on 21 July 2018 and taken to Port Colborne, Ontario to be broken up. However, the hull was still extent as of 8 May 2020.

Notes

Citations

References

 
 
 

1961 ships
Merchant ships of Canada
Ships built in Collingwood, Ontario
Great Lakes freighters
Canada Steamship Lines